Haplopacha is a genus of moths in the family Lasiocampidae. The genus was erected by Per Olof Christopher Aurivillius in 1905.

Species
Haplopacha cinerea Aurivillius, 1905
Haplopacha lunata Dupont, Simonsen & Zilli, 2016
Haplopacha ndoumoi Dupont, Simonsen & Zilli, 2016
Haplopacha riftensis Dupont, Simonsen & Zilli, 2016
Haplopacha tangani Dupont, Simonsen & Zilli, 2016

References 

Lasiocampidae